Lane cake, also known as prize cake or Alabama Lane cake, is a bourbon-laced baked cake traditional in the American South. According to food scholar Neil Ravenna, the inventor was Emma Rylander Lane, of Clayton, Alabama, who won first prize with it at the county fair in Columbus, Georgia.  She called it "Prize Cake" when she self-published a cookbook, A Few Good Things to Eat in 1898. Her published recipe included raisins, pecans, and coconut, and called for the layers to be baked in pie tins lined with ungreased brown paper rather than in cake pans.

The Lane cake is sometimes confused with the Lady Baltimore cake, which also is a liquor-laden fruit-filled cake. While the Lane cake originated in Alabama, the Lady Baltimore came from Charleston. Sisters Florrie and Nina Ottolengui, managers of the Women's Exchange Tea tearoom are credited with developing it. 

Many variations of the Lane cake now exist, with three or more layers of white sponge cake, separated by a filling that typically includes pecans, raisins and coconut soaked in a generous amount of bourbon, wine or brandy. It may be frosted on the top, on the sides, or both.

Lane cake is often found in the South at receptions, holiday dinners, or wedding showers.

Recipe
The cake has a reputation as being difficult to make, but modern equipment and ingredients have simplified the process. When the recipe originated, there were no stand or electric hand mixers.  Even hand-crank eggbeaters were not widely available. Bakers put in much hard labor beating the egg whites to frothy soft peaks. The cakes had to be watched carefully during baking because the wood-fired ovens had no thermostats. The pecans, raisins, and coconut were chopped by hand or put through a meat grinder.  Today an electric food processor might be used. Because the filling can be quickly chilled in a refrigerator, it is now easier to produce a stiff filling that will hold up the multi-layer cake without the layers sliding.

Recipes for Lane cake vary because so many Southern cooks fiercely guarded their recipes, passing them down from generation to generation. to recreate the family tradition. One such cook, Atlanta baker and Alabama native Lise Ode wrote about her work to create a recipe that matched her memories. Professional chef Tori Avey includes a recipe for Lane cake on her website complete with pictures of each step. Although it is difficult to locate a copy of Emma Rylander Lane's original cookbook or the revised edition published in 1989, Some Good Things to Eat, the recipe can be found in many older cookbooks. The Purefoy Hotel Cook Book published in 1953 has the recipe for Lane cake appearing on page 123–124.

Krystina Castella and Terry Lee Stone include a recipe for Lane cake in their cookbook Booze Cakes: Confections Spiked With Spirits, Wine, and Beer which uses 2 tablespoons of bourbon in the cake, 1 cup in the filling, and a buttercream frosting made from 1 cup unsalted butter, 1/4 cup half-and-half, 3 cups confectioner's sugar, 1/4 cup bourbon, and 1/4 teaspoon salt.

The original recipe for Lane cake called for 1/4 cup bourbon added to the filling mixture only, although the bourbon was sometimes replaced with grape juice by cooks who didn't want to use alcohol. Whisky, wine, and brandy are mentioned in other recipes. Other Lane cake bakers took great pride in using a homemade liqueur, such as scuppernong wine, a wine made from scuppernong grapes that grew plentifully in the southeastern United States.  These special additions made their cakes novel and hard to copy. Because Lane cakes improve with age, many bakers placed the finished Lane cake in a covered tin and allowed it to "set" for up to a week before serving, in order for the spongy cake to "soak up" the flavor. Some also wrapped the unfrosted cake in a cloth that had been soaked in the bourbon, brandy, wine, or grape juice while it set in a cool place, often in a bowl set inside a dishpan and then covered. It was then frosted with 7-minute boiled icing or other whipped white frosting, usually a day or more before serving.

Lane cakes in American culture
In Harper Lee's To Kill a Mockingbird, a Lane cake is given as a welcome gift to Aunt Alexandra by Miss Maudie Atkinson. The narrator in the story is the young daughter, Scout, of Atticus Finch. Scout reports, "Miss Maudie baked a Lane cake so loaded with shinny it made me tight", "shinny" being a slang term for moonshine, and "tight" suggesting feeling the effects of the alcohol. 
Also in To Kill a Mockingbird, Miss Maudie bakes a Lane cake for Mr. Avery, who was severely injured in an attempt to put out a fire in her home. “Soon as I can get my hands clean and when Stephanie Crawford’s not looking, I’ll make him a Lane cake. That Stephanie’s been after my recipe for thirty years, and if she thinks I’ll give it to her just because I’m staying with her she’s got another think coming.”

In Jimmy Carter's memoir Christmas in Plains, he writes: "I guess it would be more accurate to say that Mama never liked to cook, and welcomed my father into the kitchen whenever he was willing. He was always the one who prepared batter cakes or waffles for breakfast, and he would even make a couple of Lane cakes for Christmas. Since this cake recipe required a strong dose of bourbon, it was just for the adult relatives, doctors, nurses, and other friends who would be invited to our house for eggnog."

In May 2016 Lane cake was voted the official state cake of Alabama.

See also

 List of regional dishes of the United States
 Tipsy cake

References

Cuisine of the Southern United States
Bourbon whiskey
Foods with alcoholic drinks
Symbols of Alabama
American cakes
Sponge cakes
Layer cakes